Bhatapara railway station (station code:- BYT) is a station that is located in Bhatapara, Baloda Bazar district, Chhattisgarh. It falls under South East Central Railway zone's Raipur railway division. It is connected by rail to the nearby stations of Hathband, Tilda, Nipania, Dagori, and Bilha.

References

 
Divisions of Indian Railways
2003 establishments in Chhattisgarh

Transport in Raipur, Chhattisgarh